December 21 - Eastern Orthodox liturgical calendar - December 23

All fixed commemorations below celebrated on January 4 by Eastern Orthodox Churches on the Old Calendar.

For December 22nd, Orthodox Churches on the Old Calendar commemorate the Saints listed on December 9.

Feasts
 Forefeast of the Nativity of Christ.

Saints
 Great Martyr Anastasia of Sirmium, Deliverer from Bonds, and: 
 her teacher Martyr Chrysogonus, and with them: 
 the Martyrs Theodota, Evodius,  Eutychianus, and others, who suffered under Diocletian (304)
 Hieromartyr Zoilus, Priest, under Diocletian (304)

Pre-Schism Western saints
 Martyrs Demetrius, Honoratus and Florus, in Ostia in Italy.  (see also: November 21)
 Thirty Holy Martyrs of Rome (ca.303)
 Saint Flavian, an ex-prefect of Rome (362)
 Saint Hunger of Utrecht (Hungerus Frisus), Bishop of Utrecht in the Netherlands from 856; during the Norman invasion he fled to Prüm in Germany where he died (866)
 Saint Amaswinthus of Málaga, monk and Abbot for forty-two years at a monastery in Silva de Málaga in Spain (982)

Post-Schism Orthodox saints
—

New martyrs and confessors
 New Hieromartyrs Demetrius and Theodore, Priests (1938)
 New Martyr Boris Talantov of Kostroma, Soviet teacher, participant in the dissident movement in the USSR, church publicist and political prisoner (1971)

Other commemorations
 Commemoration of the Thyranoixia (consecration) of the "Great Church of Christ", the Hagia Sophia.
 Repose of Monk Dositheus, hermit of the Roslavl Forests and Optina Monastery (1828)

Icon gallery

Notes

References

Sources
 December 22/January 4. Orthodox Calendar (PRAVOSLAVIE.RU).
 January 4 / December 22. HOLY TRINITY RUSSIAN ORTHODOX CHURCH (A parish of the Patriarchate of Moscow).
 December 22. OCA - The Lives of the Saints.
 The Autonomous Orthodox Metropolia of Western Europe and the Americas (ROCOR). St. Hilarion Calendar of Saints for the year of our Lord 2004. St. Hilarion Press (Austin, TX). p. 1.
 December 22. Latin Saints of the Orthodox Patriarchate of Rome.
 The Roman Martyrology. Transl. by the Archbishop of Baltimore. Last Edition, According to the Copy Printed at Rome in 1914. Revised Edition, with the Imprimatur of His Eminence Cardinal Gibbons. Baltimore: John Murphy Company, 1916.
Greek Sources
 Great Synaxaristes:  22 ΔΕΚΕΜΒΡΙΟΥ. ΜΕΓΑΣ ΣΥΝΑΞΑΡΙΣΤΗΣ.
  Συναξαριστής. 22 Δεκεμβρίου. ECCLESIA.GR. (H ΕΚΚΛΗΣΙΑ ΤΗΣ ΕΛΛΑΔΟΣ). 
Russian Sources
  4 января (22 декабря). Православная Энциклопедия под редакцией Патриарха Московского и всея Руси Кирилла (электронная версия). (Orthodox Encyclopedia - Pravenc.ru).
  22 декабря (ст.ст.) 4 января 2013 (нов. ст.). Русская Православная Церковь Отдел внешних церковных связей. (DECR).

December in the Eastern Orthodox calendar